Neonympha helicta, the helicta satyr, is a species of brush-footed butterfly in the family Nymphalidae. It is found in North America. There is some question that this putative species is the same as that figured by Jacob Hübner as Oreas helicta

The MONA or Hodges number for Neonympha helicta is 4576.1.

Subspecies
These three subspecies belong to the species Neonympha helicta:
 Neonympha helicta dadeensis Gatrelle, 1999 i g
 Neonympha helicta helicta (Hübner, 1808) i g
 Neonympha helicta septentrionalis W. Davis, 1924 i g
Data sources: i = ITIS, c = Catalogue of Life, g = GBIF, b = Bugguide.net

References

Further reading

 

Neonympha
Articles created by Qbugbot
Butterflies described in 1808
Butterflies of North America
Taxa named by Jacob Hübner